I'll Stay Me is the debut studio album by American country music artist Luke Bryan. The album was released on August 14, 2007, Capitol Records Nashville. The album produced three singles with "All My Friends Say", "We Rode in Trucks", and "Country Man". The album has been certified gold by the Recording Industry Association of America (RIAA).

Content
Prior to signing with Capitol Records as a recording artist, Luke Bryan co-wrote Billy Currington's late 2006-early 2007 single "Good Directions".

Bryan made his debut as a singer with the single "All My Friends Say". Released in 2007, it peaked at number five on the Billboard country music charts. Bryan co-wrote the song with Lonnie Wilson and Jeff Stevens, the latter of whom also produced the album. Following as singles were "We Rode in Trucks" and "Country Man". "We Rode in Trucks" is Bryan's lowest-charting single, reaching number 33 on Hot Country Songs. "Country Man" peaked at number ten.

Critical reception

Thom Jurek of AllMusic rated the album three stars out of five, stating that "Despite the calculating, swing for the fences nature of Bryan's debut, he is genuinely gifted, and executes nearly flawlessly." Michael Sudhalter of Country Standard Time gave the album a mostly positive review, stating that Bryan "proves his versatility on an album that combines twangy vocals and fiddles with catchy melodies."

Track listing

Personnel
Mike Brignardello – bass guitar, tic tac bass
Luke Bryan – lead vocals
J. T. Corenflos – electric guitar, baritone guitar
John Barlow Jarvis – piano, organ
Jeff King – electric guitar
Paul Leim – drums, percussion
B. James Lowry – acoustic guitar
Gordon Mote – piano, organ
Mike Rojas – piano, organ, Wurlitzer
Joe Spivey – fiddle, mandolin
Russell Terrell – background vocals

Chart performance

Weekly charts

Year-end charts

Singles

Certifications

References

2007 debut albums 
Capitol Records Nashville albums
Luke Bryan albums